Cheapside is an unincorporated community in Northampton County, Virginia, United States.

The nearby Custis Tombs were listed on the National Register of Historic Places in 1970.

References

GNIS reference

Unincorporated communities in Virginia
Unincorporated communities in Northampton County, Virginia